Arceuthobium divaricatum is a species of dwarf mistletoe known as pinyon dwarf mistletoe. It is native to the southwestern United States and Baja California, where it lives in woodlands as a parasite on various species of pine, particularly Colorado Pinyon and Single-leaf Pinyon. This is a small shrub which is visible as a network of scaly brown or greenish stems no more than 12 centimeters long extending above the bark of its host tree. Most of the mistletoe is located inside the host tree, attached to it via haustoria, which tap the tree for water and nutrients. The leaves of the mistletoe are reduced to thin scales on its surface. It is dioecious, with male and female mistletoe plants producing spikes of staminate and pistillate flowers, respectively. The fruit is a sticky berry a few millimeters long which explodes to disperse the seeds it contains several meters away from the parent plant and its host tree.

External links
Jepson Manual Treatment
Photo gallery

divaricatum